Valentin Feurstein (1 January 1885 – 8 June 1970) was an Austrian military officer who served in the Austrian and German armies.

Feurstein joined the Austro-Hungarian Army in 1907, he served in World War I and in the Austrian Bundesheer in the 1930s. He was commander of 3rd Division (stationed in St. Pölten). After the Anschluss and the incorporation of the Bundesheer into it, Feurstein served as a general in the Wehrmacht.

He commanded the 2nd Mountain Division during Fall Weiss and during the Norwegian Campaign. In 1941, he was promoted to full general of mountain troops (Gen.d.Geb.Tr.). He also served on the Italian front in 1943.

Feurstein was city commander of Bregenz in 1945 and tried to declare Bregenz a non-combat zone.

Valentin Feurstein died on 8 June 1970.

Awards and decorations
 Knight's Cross of the Iron Cross (12 August 1944)

References

External links

1885 births
1970 deaths
People from Bregenz
Austrian generals
Generals of Mountain Troops
Austro-Hungarian military personnel of World War I
Recipients of the Knight's Cross of the Iron Cross
Austrian military personnel of World War II
Austro-Hungarian Army officers